X-ray pulsar-based navigation and timing (XNAV) or simply pulsar navigation is a navigation technique whereby the periodic X-ray signals emitted from pulsars are used to determine the location of a vehicle, such as a spacecraft in deep space. A vehicle using XNAV would compare received X-ray signals with a database of known pulsar frequencies and locations. Similar to GPS, this comparison would allow the vehicle to calculate its position accurately (±5 km). The advantage of using X-ray signals over radio waves is that X-ray telescopes can be made smaller and lighter. Experimental demonstrations have been reported in 2018.

Spacecraft navigation

Studies
The Advanced Concepts Team of ESA studied in 2003 the feasibility of x-ray pulsar navigation in collaboration with the Universitat Politecnica de Catalunya in Spain. After the study, the interest in the XNAV technology within the European Space Agency was consolidated leading, in 2012, to two different and more detailed studies performed by GMV AEROSPACE AND DEFENCE (ES) and the National Physical Laboratory (UK).

Experiments
XPNAV 1 On 9 November 2016, the Chinese Academy of Sciences launched an experimental pulsar navigation satellite called XPNAV 1. XPNAV-1 has a mass of 240 kg, and is in a 493 km × 512 km, 97.41° orbit. XPNAV-1 will characterize 26 nearby pulsars for their pulse frequency and intensity to create a navigation database that could be used by future operational missions. The satellite is expected to operate for five to ten years. XPNAV-1 is the first pulsar navigation mission launched into orbit.

SEXTANT SEXTANT (Station Explorer for X-ray Timing and Navigation Technology) is a NASA-funded project developed at the Goddard Space Flight Center that is testing XNAV on-orbit on board the International Space Station in connection with the NICER project, launched on 3 June 2017 on the SpaceX CRS-11 ISS resupply mission. If this is successful, XNAV may be used as secondary navigation technology for the planned Orion missions. In January 2018, X-ray navigation feasibility was demonstrated using NICER/SEXTANT on ISS. It reported a 7 km accuracy (in 2 days).

Aircraft navigation
In 2014, a feasibility study was carried out by the National Aerospace Laboratory of Amsterdam, for use of pulsars in place of GPS in navigation. The advantage of pulsar navigation would be more available signals than from satnav constellations, being unjammable, with the broad range of frequencies available, and security of signal sources from destruction by antisatellite weapons.

Types of pulsar for XNAV

Among pulsars, millisecond pulsars are good candidate to be space-time references. In particular, extraterrestrial intelligence might encode rich information using millisecond pulsar signals, and the metadata about XNAV is likely to be encoded by reference to millisecond pulsars. Finally, it has been suggested that advanced extraterrestrial intelligence might have tweaked or engineered millisecond pulsars for the goals of timing, navigation and communication.

References

External links
Johns Hopkins APL to Develop Deep Space Navigation Network
US Government Contract Proposal for X-Ray Pulsar Based Navigation and Time Determination

Navigational aids
Pulsars
Celestial navigation